Wressle (with spelling variations of Wressell, and Wressel, in Leland's Itinerary as Wreshil, in the Domesday Book as Weresa) is a village and civil parish in the East Riding of Yorkshire, England, lying on the eastern bank of the River Derwent approximately  north-west of Howden.

Wressle village has a late 18th-century church, St John, and on the western fringe of the village is the Grade I listed structure and scheduled monument, the ruins of Wressle Castle. Wressle railway station is located within the village.

The parish includes the hamlets of Brind, Newsholme and Loftshome. Wressle lies within the Parliamentary constituency of Haltemprice and Howden an area that mainly consists of middle class suburbs, towns and villages. The area is affluent, placed as the 10th most affluent in the country in a Barclays Private Clients survey,  and has one of the highest proportions of owner-occupiers in the country.

Geography
The  civil parish of Wressle is bounded by the civil parishes of Hemingbrough and Cliffe in the county of North Yorkshire to the west, separated by the River Derwent; by Bubwith to the north, separated by the Fleet Dike; by Spaldington and Howden to the east; and by Asselby and Barmby on the Marsh to the south.

The civil parish contains Wressle and the hamlets of Brind and Newsholme. The Hull to Selby railway line runs east–west through the parish, passing Wressle on the southern edge, and the A63 also passes east–west through the southern part of the parish, skirting Newsholme, and passing Loftsome Bridge.

According to the 2011 UK Census, Wressle parish had a population of 271, an increase on the 2001 UK Census figure of 261.

History

Wressle Castle
Wressle Castle was a quadrangular castle originally was built for Thomas Percy in around 1380. It is ruinous and not open to the public.

Wressle village

Wressle was listed as a Manor (Weresa) in the Domesday Book of 1086.

An early church is thought to have been destroyed during the English Civil War as it represented a potential fortification; church services were then held in the chapel in the remains of Wressle Castle, until that was destroyed by fire (1796). The parish church of St John of Beverley, now a Grade II listed building, was built in 1799 of brick with stone dressings, as a replacement.

Other 18th-century buildings still extant include the Castle Farmhouse (1796) built to house the farmer after the fire in Wressle Castle; and the Long Barn (late 18th century) near to the castle site, Holly Cottage in Wressle village (mid-18th century); all built of brick.  Rowland Hall, east of the village was built in the late 18th century in brick with stone dressings and is now Grade II listed.

In 1840 the Hull and Selby Railway was opened, passing south of Wressle, with a cast-iron bridge over the Derwent; services calling at Wressle are recorded as early as 1843, with  a full train service at Wressle station by 1855. A school with an attached schoolmaster's house was erected in 1854.

A windmill was built at Mill Farm, east of the village church, in the 19th century; by 1890 it was out of use.

The village has had minimal urban growth in the industrial and modern age. In 1997 planning permission was obtained for a new small street of 5 houses off Main Street, named 'Derwent Court'.

Loftsome

Loftsome and Loftsome Bridge were small hamlets in the parish of Wressle. The Derwent was once crossed by a ferry at Loftsome. A swing bridge crossing of the Derwent was built at Loftsome in 1804, operated as a toll bridge.

There has been an inn at Loftsome Bridge since at least the 1800s. By 1823 the inn was known as the Loftsome Bridge Inn.

In the 1870s Loftsome's population was 20.

The original Loftsome Bridge remained in use to the early 1930s, at which time a new bridge was built for the Hull-Selby road (part of the A63).

In the late 2000s Yorkshire Water had two 1.3 MW wind turbines installed at its site in Loftsome.

References

Sources

Further reading

External links

Villages in the East Riding of Yorkshire
Civil parishes in the East Riding of Yorkshire